Darío Sala (born October 17, 1974) is an Argentine association football administrator and former player. A goalkeeper, he played with teams including Belgrano, Los Andes, and River Plate in Argentina; Deportivo Cali in Colombia; and FC Dallas in Major League Soccer (MLS), where he played from 2005 to 2010. He served as general manager of Jacksonville Armada FC of the North American Soccer League (NASL) from 2013 to 2015.

Early life
Sala was born into a working-class family in Córdoba. He aspired to be a soldier and attended a top military prep school at age 11. On weekends, Sala returned to his home to sell churros with his family outside the local soccer stadiums. Sala had no interest in football and instead played team handball. At an early age, he earned a place on Argentina's national handball team as a right winger.

Career

Early career
After becoming a lieutenant in the Argentine Army, Sala started law school at the age of 18. As a way to get free drinks, he would bet the professional players a Coke that he could stop their shots from outside the 18-yard box. His efforts caught the attention of a scout, who, in 1995 signed him as a reserve player for first division powerhouse San Lorenzo. At San Lorenzo, Sala was coached by Hector Baley, goalkeeper for the 1978 Argentine World Cup squad.

Becoming a starter
After his short stint at San Lorenzo, he was traded to his hometown team, Talleres and later Racing de Córdoba. In 1996, he joined Belgrano of the Primera B Nacional Argentina; for the next two years he would be the starter winning Belgrano a promotion to the Primera División Argentina. He moved on to Los Andes, again helping his club to a promotion to the Primera División. Sala's good play earned him a look from Argentine powerhouse River Plate who bought his rights. After earning a few non-league match starts, he was loaned out to rival Independiente where he started for two seasons. After two seasons Independiente were looking to buy Sala, but the price was not right. As the Argentine economy unraveled, River officials looked to loan him to a team that could actually afford Sala's price tag; Deportivo Cali in Colombia was that club.

Leaving Argentina
At Cali, he won goalkeeper of the year honors for the league and was named top foreigner in the league. He also enjoyed international acclaim for being the least scored upon goalkeeper in the Copa Libertadores 2003. Cali attempted to buy Sala's rights, but, due to a personal problem, Sala did not accept the move. Sala was offered a trial for the MetroStars which he refused. He returned to Argentina playing with Newell's Old Boys; he was the second goalkeeper behind Justo Villar and was loaned to Arsenal de Sarandí where he was the starter.

Move to the US
During the 2005 MLS season, Sala was signed by FC Dallas. He made one appearance, a start, during the season which resulted in a shutout. During the 2006 Major League Soccer season, Dario Sala was controversially announced the starter. He excelled throughout the season earning 28 starts, 93 saves, a 1.24 GAA, and 14 wins, leading the team to a first-place finish In two playoffs games against the Colorado Rapids, Sala made many crucial stops, but it wasn't enough to win the series as FC Dallas lost 5–4 on penalties. After the match, the Rapid players taunted the FC Dallas supporters, namely The Inferno. Sala, trying to divert the attention of the Rapids, ultimately punched Hunter Freeman as a result of the scuffle. He later apologized, but was fined and suspended for six games anyway. During the 2007 Major League Soccer season, Dario Sala was sidelined for the first six games due to the suspension received during the 2006 playoffs. He made his first appearance of the season on May 12, 2007, in a game versus the Kansas City Wizards, leading the team to a road win with an amazing series of 9 saves. Dario went on to play 19 regular season games (8-7-2) in 2007, missing an additional 6 games due to a knee injury.  In 2008, Sala started 28 games, missing only two due to a right hip injury.  He posted career bests in minutes played with 2,520 and shutouts with seven.  He finished the season with a 1.32 goals against average, helping lead the team to the fourth-best goal differential (+4) in Major League Soccer.

After the 2010 MLS season FC Dallas declined Sala's contract option and he elected to participate in the 2010 MLS Re-Entry Draft. Sala became a free agent in Major League Soccer when he was not selected in the Re-Entry draft. Shortly thereafter he retired as a player and began a new career as a player agent.

Jacksonville Armada
In 2013, Sala became a part of Sunshine Soccer Group, with a goal of bringing a North American Soccer League franchise to Jacksonville, Florida. The group was awarded an expansion team, along with Oklahoma City, on July 25 of that year. The team began play in 2015. Sala ran the operations of the team and served as general manager.

Sala was fired along with the entire coaching staff of the Armada in September 2015.

Personal
He is married to Margot, an American, and his children, Alexandra, Valentina, Francesca, Emmanuel, and Agustina. In his free time, Sala enjoys playing golf and handball, as well as skydiving.

Honors

FC Dallas
Major League Soccer Western Conference Championship (1): 2010

References

External links
MLS player profile
Guardian statistics
 Argentine Primera statistics

1974 births
Living people
Footballers from Córdoba, Argentina
Argentine footballers
Argentine Primera División players
Categoría Primera A players
San Lorenzo de Almagro footballers
Talleres de Córdoba footballers
Club Atlético Belgrano footballers
Club Atlético Los Andes footballers
Deportivo Cali footballers
Club Atlético Independiente footballers
Club Atlético River Plate footballers
Liga MX players
Chiapas F.C. footballers
Arsenal de Sarandí footballers
Newell's Old Boys footballers
Xerez CD footballers
FC Dallas players
Expatriate soccer players in the United States
Expatriate footballers in Colombia
Major League Soccer players
Argentine expatriate footballers
Association football goalkeepers
Argentine Army officers
Atlanta United FC non-playing staff